The Miller oilfield is a deep reservoir under the North Sea, 240 kilometres north-east of Peterhead in UKCS Blocks 16/7b and 16/8b. It was discovered in 1983 by BP  in a water depth of 100 metres. The field is named after Hugh Miller who contributed to Scottish geology in the early nineteenth century. 

The Miller field reached the end of its economic oil and gas producing life in 2007 when Cessation of Production (CoP) approval was received from the UK government. Preparations are currently under way to decommission the Miller platform, but the oil and gas pipelines will be preserved for future opportunities. 

On 1 April 2009, sixteen people were killed in the crash of a helicopter carrying workers from the Miller field back to Aberdeen.

Geology
The reservoir consists of Upper Jurassic Brae Formation turbidites, 2 km deep, in the South Viking graben.  The Kimmeridge Clay Formation is the source rock.

Reservoir

Development
The Miller platform was built by Highlands Fabricators in Nigg Bay, it was installed in July 1991. Its first year of peak production was 1993 when it produced 5.9 million tonnes per year.

Export pipelines
Gas export from Miller was via a sour gas pipeline system (Miller Gas System) comprising a 241 km,  sealine to St Fergus and then on via a 17.5 km  landline to Peterhead Power Station.

Miller oil was pumped via a 7.5 km-long,  export pipeline to the Brae A platform and then onwards via the Forties pipeline system to the mainland.

In 2003, BP constructed a new 8.5 km,  gas pipeline between the Brae B and Miller platforms to allow gas to be exported from Brae to Miller for use in the Miller Field EOR (Enhanced oil recovery) scheme.

Decommissioning
Formal cessation of production for the Miller field was approved by the DECC in September 2007. In 2009, BP estimated the gross cost of decommissioning the field to be of the order of £300 million. 

The initial phase of decommissioning activities involving well abandonment and topsides cleanup were completed by the end of 2009. The oil and gas export pipelines have been flushed clear of hydrocarbons and are being left in place for potential future use. The Miller platform topside and jacket will remain in place for several years while detailed plans for their removal are developed. The Jigsaw search and rescue helicopter will remain on the Miller platform during this period with minimum staffing to continue to support search and rescue operations.

Carbon sequestration
BP developed plans to reuse the structure for deep carbon sequestration.

References

Oil fields of Scotland